South Australian was a composite-hulled clipper ship that was built in Sunderland in 1868 and sank in the Bristol Channel in 1889. For nearly two decades she voyaged annually between London and South Australia.

Building
William Pile built South Australian at North Sands, Sunderland, launching her on 24 February 1868 and completing her that July. She had three masts and was a full-rigged ship.

Captain David Bruce supervised her building, and she was named by a daughter of Henry Martin, a South Australian part-owner.

South Australians original owner was Joseph Moore of Devitt and Moore's "Adelaide Line" of packet boats, underwritten by a consortium of investors. Moore registered her in London. Her United Kingdom official number was 60837 and her code letters were HFJC.

Clipper career
Captain Bruce was South Australians first Master, and commanded her until 1872. She was then commanded alternately by his sons: John Bruce 1872–74 and 1877–80, and Alexander Bruce 1876–77. John Howard Barrett commanded her 1882–83 and 1885–86. Barrett had previously been Master of Outalpa and St Vincent, and later commanded  and Illawarra.

Final years
In 1887 William J Woodside of Belfast bought South Australian. He used her to carry cargo to India and New Brunswick, commanded by Captain James Arthurs.

On 13 February 1889 while on a passage from Cardiff to Rosario, Argentina loaded with railway rails and fishplates, she ran into a gale off Lundy and the captain decided to run before the wind. As the ship rolled in the great seas her cargo began to shift in her hold as a solid mass. In the early hours of 14 February the cargo broke through her hull.

As the ship began to sink, her crew launched a lifeboat in difficult conditions and all but one of the crew survived. They drifted for 12 hours, until the schooner Spray rescued them. They were transferred to the steam trawler Flying Scotchman, which landed them at Swansea.

Wreck
It is about three miles northeast of Lundy. In 2015 Wessex Archaeology undertook a geophysical mapping survey of the wreck for the club.

Some other clipper ships on the England to Adelaide service

References

1868 ships
Clippers
Full-rigged ships
Maritime incidents in February 1889
Sailing ships of the United Kingdom
Ships built in England